Johan Vansummeren (born 4 February 1981) is a Belgian former professional road racing cyclist, who rode professionally between 2004 and 2016 for the , ,  and  teams.

Biography
Vansummeren was born, raised, and resides in Lommel, Flanders, Belgium.

Although Vansummeren's role was primarily that of a domestique, he competed as a team leader during the classic season. In 2011, Vansummeren won the biggest race of his career, Paris–Roubaix. Vansummeren won the race after escaping from three other riders with  remaining, winning by nineteen seconds at the velodrome in Roubaix. He was victorious, despite riding the final  with a flat tire. Vansummeren also won the 2007 Tour de Pologne and rode the Tour de France nine times.

Vansummeren signed with AG2R La Mondiale for the 2015 and 2016 seasons. In June 2016, he announced his retirement from the sport after being diagnosed with a heart problem that had been detected in February at the Tour of Oman and resulted in him missing the classics season.

Major results

1999
 1st  Overall Junior Tour of Wales
2001
 4th Overall Le Triptyque des Monts et Châteaux
 4th Circuit de Wallonie
 5th Overall Ronde de l'Isard
1st Stage 5
 8th Grand Prix de Waregem
2002
 1st Circuit de Wallonie
 1st Zellik–Galmaarden
 3rd Overall Le Triptyque des Monts et Châteaux
 5th Ronde van Vlaanderen U23
2003
 1st Liège–Bastogne–Liège Espoirs
 2nd  Road race, UCI Under-23 Road World Championships
 3rd Beverbeek Classic
 4th Ronde van Vlaanderen U23
 7th Overall Tour of Slovenia
 9th Time trial, UEC European Under-23 Road Championships
 10th Overall Tour de Normandie
 10th Overall Le Triptyque des Monts et Châteaux
2004
 8th Grand Prix Rudy Dhaenens
 10th Grand Prix Eddy Merckx (with Bert Roesems)
2005
 4th Overall Tour Down Under
2006
 1st  Points classification Tour of Britain
 5th Road race, National Road Championships
 9th Grand Prix d'Isbergues
2007
 1st  Overall Tour de Pologne
1st Stage 7
 1st Stage 1 (TTT) Settimana Internazionale di Coppi e Bartali
2008
 8th Paris–Roubaix
2009
 5th Paris–Roubaix
 10th Clásica de San Sebastián
2011
 1st Paris–Roubaix
 1st Duo Normand (with Thomas Dekker)
2012
 1st Stage 2 (TTT) Tour of Qatar
 9th Paris–Roubaix
 10th Strade Bianche
2014
 10th Kuurne–Brussels–Kuurne

Grand Tour general classification results timeline

References

External links

Cycling Base: Johan Vansummeren 
Cycling Quotient: Johan Vansummeren
Garmin-Sharp: Johan Vansummeren

1981 births
Living people
Belgian male cyclists
Cyclists at the 2008 Summer Olympics
Olympic cyclists of Belgium
People from Lommel
Cyclists from Limburg (Belgium)